Pteragogus is a genus of wrasses native to the Indian Ocean and the western Pacific Ocean.

Species
The 10 currently recognized species in this genus are:
 Pteragogus aurigarius (J. Richardson, 1845)
 Pteragogus clarkae J. E. Randall, 2013
 Pteragogus cryptus J. E. Randall, 1981 (cryptic wrasse)
 Pteragogus enneacanthus (Bleeker, 1853) (cockerel wrasse)
 Pteragogus flagellifer (Valenciennes, 1839) (cocktail wrasse)
 Pteragogus guttatus (Fowler & B. A. Bean, 1928) (sneaky wrasse)
 Pteragogus pelycus J. E. Randall, 1981 (sideburn wrasse)
 Pteragogus taeniops (W. K. H. Peters, 1855) (cheekbar wrasse)
 Pteragogus trispilus J. E. Randall, 2013
 Pteragogus variabilis J. E. Randall, 2013

References

Labridae
Marine fish genera
Taxa named by Wilhelm Peters